Turbo Vision is a character-mode text user interface framework included with Borland Pascal, Turbo Pascal, and Borland C++ circa 1990. It was used by Borland itself to write the integrated development environments (IDE) for these programming languages. By default, Turbo Vision applications replicate the look and feel of these IDEs, including edit controls, list boxes, check boxes, radio buttons and menus, all of which have built-in mouse support. Later it was deprecated in favor of Object Windows Library, the Win16 API, and the GUI tools of Borland Delphi.

Around 1997, the C++ version, including source code, was released by Borland into the public domain and is currently being ported and developed by an open-source community on SourceForge under the GPL license. An older update of the Borland code by Sergio Sigala is available under the BSD license.

The Pascal version, which was distributed alongside Borland Pascal 7 on a "bonus" disk, was never released under a free software license, so the Free Pascal project recreated its own version by backporting a clone made by Leon de Boer that ran in graphical mode back to textmode. The result is called Free Vision. Over the years this codebase has grown stable on nearly all operating systems and architectures that FPC supports. The textmode IDE is very close to the original TP environment, with built-in compiler and IDE much closer than e.g. RHIDE, and supporting functionality like code folding.

Unicode support 

One of the factors limiting Turbo Vision's popularity was the absence of Unicode support in the original Borland version. As of October 2020, there are Unicode versions for C++ and Free Pascal.

See also 
 Box-drawing characters

References

External links 
 Free Vision - Free Pascal's implementation of Turbo Vision
 TVision website
 "Sigala's version"
 Turbo Vision resources
 A lookalike implementation for Java

Text user interface libraries
Conio
Pascal (programming language) libraries
Computer libraries
Borland software
Free software
Public-domain software with source code
Pascal (programming language) software